Víctor Aravena Pincheira (born 5 February 1990 in Coronel, Chile)  is a Chilean athlete competing mostly in the long-distance running events.

Personal bests
 3000 m: 7:59.91 min –  Concepción, 12 May 2012
 5000 m: 13:46.94 min –  Toronto, 25 July 2015
 10,000 m: 28:49.89 min –  Concepción, 25 May 2013
 Half marathon: 1:05:01 hrs –  Temuco, 27 February 2011
 Marathon: 2:16:20 hrs –  Temuco, 20 March 2016

Competition record

References

External links
 

1990 births
Living people
Chilean male long-distance runners
Athletes (track and field) at the 2015 Pan American Games
World Athletics Championships athletes for Chile
Pan American Games bronze medalists for Chile
Pan American Games medalists in athletics (track and field)
Athletes (track and field) at the 2018 South American Games
South American Games gold medalists for Chile
South American Games bronze medalists for Chile
South American Games medalists in athletics
Medalists at the 2015 Pan American Games
People from Coronel
21st-century Chilean people